Magura Medical College is a government medical college in Magura, Bangladesh, founded in 2018 and affiliated with Sheikh Hasina Medical University. The class of the first batch of 50 students commenced on January 10, 2019, at its temporary campus, Magura Sadar Hospital.

References

Medical colleges in Bangladesh
Magura District
2018 establishments in Bangladesh
Educational institutions established in 2018
Education in Bangladesh